Olmsted Park System may refer to:

Emerald Necklace, Boston and Brookline, Massachusetts, also known as Olmsted Park System (and listed on the National Register of Historic Places (NRHP) under that name)
Parkways of Louisville, Kentucky, also known as Olmsted Park System (and listed on the NRHP under that name)
Buffalo, New York parks system, known locally as the Olmsted Park System